Gábor Szabó is a Hungarian sprint canoer who competed from the late 1980s to the late 1990s. He won three medals at the ICF Canoe Sprint World Championships with two silvers (K-4 1000 m: 1995, 1997) and a bronze (K-2 1000 m: 1990)..

References

Hungarian male canoeists
Living people
Year of birth missing (living people)
ICF Canoe Sprint World Championships medalists in kayak
20th-century Hungarian people